Ritam was a Serbian and Yugoslav popular culture magazine.

Started in February 1989, it continued under various subtitles and publishing companies until 1995. Initially a monthly publication (from 1989 until 1991), Ritam'''s publishing frequency became fairly irregular from the beginning of the breakup of Yugoslavia in 1991 until the end of its run.

HistoryRitam was founded in 1989 with the subtitle of Mesečni vodič kroz popularnu muziku, film, video, strip... i još više! (Monthly guide through popular music, film, video, comics... and more!). It was co-published by two companies — Sportinvest from Belgrade and ROID Vuk Karadžić from Paraćin. The magazine's first editor-in-chief was Momčilo Rajin. The first Ritam issue, featuring U2 band members, actor Jackie Chan, and comic book character Corto Maltese on the cover, was released on February 1, 1989. Until June 1990, 14 issues were released.

From September 1990, the magazine adopted a new name, Novi Ritam (The New Rhythm), as well as a shortened subtitle, Mesečni vodič kroz popularnu kulturu (Monthly guide through popular culture), and Rajin's post was taken over by Branko Vukojević. The magazine staffers also registered their own publishing company called Ritam, and continued to cooperate with Paraćin's Vuk Karadžić. This lasted until May 1991, during which time 8 issues appeared.

At the end of 1992, following a year-and-a-half long gap, the magazine's third incarnation appeared, entitled Ritam again. Under editorship of Dragan Ambrozić, and in addition to Ritam publishing company, record label Sorabia Disk was also listed as the magazine's publisher. Only two issues appeared under this setup, the first in October, with Rambo Amadeus on the cover, and the second in December, with Michael Stipe on the cover.

In 1993, Ritam's fourth incarnation appeared. Again with Ambrozić as editor-in-chief, and with the subtitle Vodič kroz popularnu kulturu (Guide through popular culture), the annual issue was published for the year 1993. Five more issues came out from May 1994 until June 1995 with irregular frequency.

In 2004, online magazine Popboks was founded, containing a digitalized archive of Ritam''.

References

External links
Ritam archive at Popboks.com

Defunct magazines published in Serbia
Magazines established in 1989
Magazines disestablished in 1995
Magazines published in Yugoslavia
Music magazines published in Serbia
Serbian-language magazines
Serbian rock music
Yugoslav rock music
Monthly magazines
Irregularly published magazines